Fitness and Me is an educational series of three short films produced in 1984 by Sun West Production Inc. for Walt Disney Educational to explain fitness. The series combined live-action and animation. The animation was outsourced to Pantomime Pictures.

1984 
Fitness and Me: How to Exercise - A dragon and a knight are used to show the benefit of a fitness program.
Fitness and Me: What is Fitness Exercise? - A good Fairy properly explains the facts of physical exercise to a knight.
Fitness and Me: Why Exercise? - Two knights explain to youth the benefits of exercise on their bodies.

External links
 http://www.movierevie.ws/movies/1653526/How-to-Exercise.html

Disney documentary films
Disney educational films
Disney short film series
1984 films
1980s educational films
1980s American films